Cassagnas is a commune in the Lozère department in southern France.

The village of Cassagnas lies in the valley of the River Mimente, and on the Robert Louis Stevenson Trail (GR 70), a popular long-distance path following approximately the route travelled by Robert Louis Stevenson in 1878 and described in his book Travels with a Donkey in the Cévennes.  Stevenson mentions the village by name:

See also
Communes of the Lozère department

References

Communes of Lozère